Rezophonic is a musical project organized by Mario Riso, who is also co-founder of Rock TV in Italy. The money gained will be devolved to the African Medical and Research Foundation (AMREF).

Members

Voices
Olly (The Fire-Shandon)
Cristina Scabbia (Lacuna Coil)
Vittoria Hyde
Pau (Negrita)
Giuliano Sangiorgi (Negramaro)
Mono (FFD)
Diego Mancino
DJ Ringo (Virgin Radio)
Gianluca Perotti (Extrema)
Emo and Nitto (Linea 77)
Mana (Folder)
L'Aura
Lella (Settevite)
Madaski
Micky (No Relax)
Francesco Sarcina (Le Vibrazioni)
David Moretti (Karma)
Pino Scotto (Fire Trails)
Max Zanotti (Deasonika)
Marco Cocci (Malfunk)
Morena (Macbeth)
Eva Poles (Prozac+)
Andrea Ferro (Lacuna Coil/Roskos/Virgin Radio/Andead)

Bass Guitarists
William Nicastro
Jan Galliani (Settevite)
Patrick Djivas (P.F.M.)
Marco Castellani (Le Vibrazioni/Octopus)
Sem (Guilty Method)
Saturnino (Jovanotti)
Roberta Sammarelli (Verdena)
Silvio Franco
Ivan "Liva" Lodini (Movida)
Paletta (Punkreas)
Giuseppe Fiori

Guitarists
Fabio Mittino
Tommy Massara (Extrema)
Marco Trentacoste (Deasonika)
Omar Pedrini
Maus (Lacuna Coil)
Pier Gonella
Cesare Petricich (Negrita)
Stefano Brandori
Max Brigante
Michele Albè (Piks)
Fausto Cogliati
Stef Burns
Nikki
Joxemi (Ska-P)
J.L. Battaglioni (Movida)
Giovanni Frigo (Movida)
Livio Magnini (Bluvertigo)
Noyse (Punkreas)
Pietro Quilichini

Others
Roy Paci
Andy (Bluvertigo)
Tullio De Piscopo (Batteria/Percussioni)
Mario Riso
Roberto Broggi (Guilty Method)
Andy Trix Tripodi
Davide Tomat
Morgan (Bluvertigo)

Deejays
DJ Jad (Articolo 31)
DJ Aladyn (Mennscratch)

Track list
Can You Hear Me? 3:16
Riso's Beat 2:58
L'Uomo Di Plastica [Intro] 2:05
L'Uomo Di Plastica 3:58 
I Miei Pensieri 4:17
I'M Junk 2:30
Alien 3:36
Qualcuno Da Stringere 3:54
Non Ho Più Niente Da Dire 3:45
Spasimo 4:45
Blank In Blue 4:25
Spaces And Sleeping Stone 4:39
Puro Incanto 4:49 
Can You Hear Me? (Remix) 5:19
Il Riso Di Tullio 2:45

External links
Official website

Italian musical groups